Lautaro Tomás Escalante (born 2 July 1999) is an Argentine professional footballer who plays as a midfielder for Defensa y Justicia.

Professional career
Escalante made his professional debut with Defensa y Justicia in a 4-1 Argentine Primera División win over Talleres de Córdoba on 26 January 2020.

In February 2022, Escalante was loaned out to Primera Nacional club San Martín Tucumán until the end of 2022. However, he was recalled by Defensa on 6 July 2022.

References

External links
 
 

1999 births
Living people
People from Florencio Varela Partido
Argentine footballers
Association football midfielders
Defensa y Justicia footballers
San Martín de Tucumán footballers
Argentine Primera División players
Primera Nacional players
Sportspeople from Buenos Aires Province